Tlyaratinsky District is an administrative and municipal district (raion), one of the forty-one in the Republic of Dagestan, Russia. It is located in the west of the republic. Its administrative center is the rural locality (a selo) of Tlyarata. As of the 2010 Census, the total population of the district was 22,165, with the population of Tlyarata accounting for 5.4% of that number.

Administrative and municipal status
Within the framework of administrative divisions, Tlyaratinsky District is one of the forty-one in the Republic of Dagestan. The district is divided into seventeen selsoviets which comprise eighty-nine rural localities. As a municipal division, the district is incorporated as Tlyaratinsky Municipal District. Its seventeen selsoviets are incorporated as nineteen rural settlements within the municipal district. The selo of Tlyarata serves as the administrative center of both the administrative and municipal district.

References

Notes

Sources

Districts of Dagestan
